Telipna sheffieldi is a butterfly in the family Lycaenidae. It is found in Uganda.

References

Endemic fauna of Uganda
Butterflies described in 1926
Poritiinae
Taxa named by George Thomas Bethune-Baker